Canadian actor and musician Ryan Gosling has received various awards and nominations throughout his career. Gosling first came to public attention as a child star on the Disney Channel's The Mickey Mouse Club (1993–95) and went on to appear in other family entertainment programs including Are You Afraid of the Dark? (1995), Goosebumps (1996), Breaker High (1997–98), and Young Hercules (1998–99). His first serious role was as a Jewish neo-Nazi in The Believer (2001), and he then built a reputation for playing misfits in independent films such as Murder by Numbers (2002), The Slaughter Rule (2002), The United States of Leland (2003), and Stay (2005).

Gosling came to the attention of a wider audience in 2004 with a leading role in the romantic drama The Notebook, for which he won four Teen Choice Awards and an MTV Movie Award. His performance as a drug-addicted teacher in Half Nelson (2006) won him an Independent Spirit Award, and he was nominated for the Critics' Choice Movie Award, Satellite Award, Screen Actors Guild Award and Academy Award, all for Best Actor in a Leading Role. At age 26, he was the seventh-youngest Best Actor nominee at the time. Gosling's performance as a socially inept loner in Lars and the Real Girl (2007) won him a Satellite Award, and he was nominated for a Critics' Choice Movie Award, Golden Globe Award and Screen Actors Guild Award. In 2007, he starred in the courtroom thriller Fracture.

After a three-year acting hiatus, Gosling starred in both Blue Valentine and All Good Things in 2010. The former performance as a frazzled husband earned him a Critics' Choice Movie Award, Golden Globe Award, and Satellite Award nomination. 2011 proved to be a landmark year for the actor as he appeared in three mainstream films—the romantic comedy Crazy, Stupid, Love, the neo-noir crime thriller Drive, and the political drama The Ides of March—and received two Golden Globe Award nominations. His performance as an unnamed getaway driver for Drive won him his second Satellite Award, and he was nominated for a Critics' Choice Movie Award and an Independent Spirit Award.

In 2016, Gosling starred in the musical comedy-drama La La Land, playing a struggling jazz pianist. His performance earned him a Golden Globe Award for Best Actor – Motion Picture Musical or Comedy, and nominations for an Academy Award, BAFTA Award, Critics' Choice Movie Award, Satellite Award and Screen Actors Guild Award.

Major associations

Academy Awards

British Academy of Film and Television Arts Awards

Golden Globe Awards

Screen Actors Guild Awards

Other awards and nominations

Australian Academy of Cinema and Television Arts Awards

AACTA International Awards

Independent Spirit Awards

Irish Film & Television Drama Academy Awards

MTV Movie & TV Awards

National Board of Review Awards

People's Choice Awards

Satellite Awards

Saturn Awards

Santa Barbara International Film Festival

Seattle International Film Festival

ShoWest Awards

Stockholm International Film Festival

Teen Choice Awards

Village Voice Film Poll

Critics associations

Notes

References

External links 
 

Gosling, Ryan